This is a list of law enforcement agencies in the state of New Jersey.

According to the US Bureau of Justice Statistics' 2008 Census of State and Local Law Enforcement Agencies, the state had 550 law enforcement agencies employing 33,704 sworn police officers, about 389 for each 100,000 residents.

State agencies
 New Jersey Department of Corrections 
 New Jersey Department of Environmental Protection
 Division of Fish and Wildlife
 Bureau of Law Enforcement (State Conservation Officers) 
 Division of Parks and Forestry
 New Jersey Forest Fire Service
 New Jersey DEP Marine Law Enforcement Unit
 New Jersey Department of Human Services Police  
 New Jersey Office of the Attorney General
 Department of Law and Public Safety
 Division of Alcoholic Beverage Control
 Division of Consumer Affairs
 Office of Consumer Protection
 Enforcement Bureau
 Office of Weights and Measures
 NJ Division of Criminal Justice
 Division of Gaming Enforcement
 New Jersey Department of the Treasury
 Division of Taxation
 Office of Criminal Investigations
 New Jersey Juvenile Justice Commission
 New Jersey Office of Homeland Security and Preparedness
 New Jersey Election Law Enforcement Commission
 New Jersey State Park Police
 New Jersey State Parole Board
 Division of Parole (State Parole Officers)
 New Jersey State Police 
 New Jersey State Detective Agency
 New Jersey Transit Police Department

County Prosecutor's Office
 Atlantic County Prosecutor's Office 
 Bergen County Prosecutor's Office 
 Burlington County Prosecutor's Office 
 Camden County Prosecutor's Office
 Cape May County Prosecutor's Office 
 Cumberland County Prosecutor's Office 
 Essex County Prosecutor's Office
 Gloucester County Prosecutor's Office
 Hudson County Prosecutor's Office
 Hunterdon County Prosecutor's Office
 Mercer County Prosecutor's Office
 Middlesex County Prosecutor's Office
 Monmouth County Prosecutor's Office
 Morris County Prosecutor's Office []
 Ocean County Prosecutor's Office
 Passaic County Prosecutor's Office
 Salem County Prosecutor's Office
 Somerset County Prosecutor's Office
 Sussex County Prosecutor's Office
 Union County Prosecutor's Office
 Warren County Prosecutor's Office

County agencies

 Atlantic County Sheriff's Office 
 Bergen County Sheriff's Office  
 Burlington County Sheriff's Department 
 Camden County Sheriff's Office 
 Camden County Police Department
 Cape May County Sheriff's Office
 Cumberland County Sheriff's Department
 Essex County Sheriff's Office

 Gloucester County Sheriff's Office
 Hudson County Sheriff's Office
 Hunterdon County Sheriff's Office
 Mercer County Sheriff's Office
 Middlesex County Sheriff's Department
 Monmouth County Sheriff's Office
 Morris County Sheriff's Office
 Morris County Park Police

 Ocean County Sheriff's Department
 Passaic County Sheriff's Department
 Salem County Sheriff's Office
 Somerset County Sheriff's Office
 Sussex County Sheriff's Office
 Union County Sheriff's Office
 Union County Police Department
 Warren County Sheriff's Office

Corrections agencies

 New Jersey Department of Corrections
 Atlantic County Department of Public Safety
 Bergen County Corrections Division
 Burlington County Department of Corrections
 Camden County Department of Corrections
 Cape May County Correction Center
 Cumberland County Department of Corrections
 Essex County Department of Corrections
 Gloucester County Department of Corrections
 Hudson County Department of Corrections
 Hunterdon County Department of Corrections
 Mercer County Corrections Center
 Middlesex County Adult Corrections
 Monmouth County Department of Corrections
 Morris County Corrections
 Ocean County Department of Corrections
 Passaic County Sheriff's Department Bureau of Corrections
 Salem County Correctional Facility
 Somerset County Corrections
 Sussex County Sheriff's Department Jail
 Union County Division of Correctional Services
 Warren County Corrections

Municipal agencies

 Aberdeen Township Police Department
 Absecon Police Department
 Allendale Police Department
 Allenhurst Police Department
 Allentown Police Department 
 Alpine Police Department
 Andover Police Department
 Asbury Park Police Department
 Atlantic City Police Department
 Atlantic Highlands Police Department
 Audubon Police Department
 Avalon Police Department
 Avon By The Sea Police Department
 Barnegat Township Police Department
 Barrington Police Department
 Bay Head Police Department
 Bayonne Police Department
 Beach Haven Police Department
 Beachwood Police Department
 Bedminster Police Department
 Belleville Police Department
 Bellmawr Police Department
 Belmar Police Department
 Belvidere Police Department 
 Bergenfield Police Department
 Berkeley Police Department
 Berkeley Heights Police Department
 Berlin Township Police Department
 Benards Township Police Department
 Benardsville Police Department
 Beverly Police Department
 Blairstown Township Police Department
 Bloomfield Police Department
 Bloomingdale Police Department
 Bogota Police Department
 Boonton Police Department
 Boonton Township Police Department
 Bordentown City Police Department
 Bordentown Township Police Department
 Borough of Peapack and Gladstone Police Department
 Bound Brook Police Department
 Bradley Beach Police Department
 Branchburg Township Police Department
 Brick Township Police Department
 Bridgeton Police Department
 Bridgewater Township Police Department 
 Brielle Police Department
 Brigantine Police Department
 Brooklawn Police Department
 Boonton Police Department
 Boonton Township Police Department
 Buena Borough Police Department
 Burlington Police Department
 Burlington Township Police Department
 Butler Borough Police Department
 Byram Township Police Department
 Caldwell Police Department
 Cape May Police Department
 Carlstadt Police Department
 Carneys Point Police Department
 Carteret Police Department
 Cedar Grove Police Department
 Chatham Police Department
 Chatham Township Police Department
 Cherry Hill Police Department  
 Chesilhurst Police Department
 Chester Police Department
 Chester Township Police Department
 Chesterfield Township Police Department
 Cinnaminson Police Department 
 Clark Police Department
 Clayton Police Department
 Clementon Police Department
 Cliffside Park Police Department
 Clifton Police Department
 Clinton Police Department 
 Clinton Township Police Department 
 Closter Police Department
 Collingswood Police Department
 Colts Neck Township Police Department
 Cranbury Township Police Department
 Cranford Police Department
 Cresskill Police Department
 Deal Police Department
 Delanco Township Police Department
 Delaware Township Police Department | 
 Delran Police Department
 Demarest Police Department
 Denville Police Department
 Deptford Police Department
 Dover Police Department
 Dumont Police Department
 Dunellen Police Department
 East Brunswick Police Department
 East Greenwich Township Police Department
 East Hanover Township Police Department
 East Orange Police Department
 East Rutherford Police Department
 East Windsor Township Police Department
 Easthampton Township Police Department
 Eatontown Police Department
 Edgewater Police Department
 Edgewater Park Township Police Department
 Edison Police Department
 Egg Harbor City Police Department
 Egg Harbor Township Police Department
 Elizabeth Police Department
 Elk Township Police Department
 Elmer Police Department
 Elmwood Park Police Department
 Emerson Police Department
 Englewood Police Department
 Englewood Cliffs Police Department
 Englishtown Police Department
 Essex Fells Police Department
 Evesham Township Police Department
 Ewing Township Police Department
 Fair Haven Police Department
 Fair Lawn Police Department
 Fairfield Police Department
 Fairview Police Department
 Fanwood Police Department
 Far Hills Police Department
 Fieldsboro Police Department
 Flemington Borough Police Department
 Florence Township Police Department
 Florham Park Police Department
 Fort Lee Police Department
 Franklin Borough Police Department
 Franklin Lakes Police Department
 Franklin Township Police Department
 Franklin Township Police Department
 Freehold Police Department
 Frenchtown Police Department
 Galloway Township Police Department 
 Garfield Police Department
 Garwood Police Department
 Gibbsboro Police Department
 Glassboro Police Department
 Glen Ridge Police Department
 Glen Rock Police Department
 Gloucester City Police Department
 Gloucester Township Police Department
 Green Brook Township Police Department
 Greenwich Township Police Department
 Guttenberg Police Department
 Hackensack Police Department
 Hackettstown Police Department
 Haddon Heights Police Department
 Haddon Township Police Department
 Haddonfield Police Department
 Haledon Police Department
 Hamburg Police Department
 Hamilton Township Police Department
 Hammonton Police Department
 Hanover Township Police Department
 Harding Township Police Department
 Hardyston Police Department
 Harrington Park Police Department
 Harrison Police Department
 Harrison Township Police Department
 Harvey Cedars Police Department
 Hasbrouck Heights Police Department 
 Haworth Police Department
 Hawthorne Police Department
 Hazlet Township Police Department
 Hi-Nella Police Department
 High Bridge Police Department 
 Highland Park Police Department
 Highlands Police Department
 Hightstown Borough Police Department
 Hillsborough Township Police Department
 Hillsdale Police Department
 Hillside Police Department
 Hoboken Police Department
 Ho-Ho-Kus Police Department
 Holland Township Police Department
 Holmdel Township Police Department
 Hopatcong Police Department
 Hopewell Township Police Department
 Howell Township Police Department 
 Irvington Police Department
 Island Heights Police Department
 Jackson Police Department
 Jamesburg Police Department
 Jefferson Township Police Department
 Jersey City Police Department
 Keansburg Police Department
 Kearny Police Department
 Kenilworth Police Department
 Keyport Police Department
 Kinnelon Police Department
 Lacey Township Police Department
 Lakehurst Police Department
 Lakewood Police Department
 Lambertville Police Department
 Laurel Springs Police Department
 Lavallete Police Department
 Lawnside Police Department
 Lawrence Township Police Department
 Lebanon Township Police Department
 Leonia Police Department
 Lincoln Park Police Department 
 Linden Police Department
 Lindenwold Police Department
 Linwood Police Department
 Little Egg Harbor Police Department
 Little Falls Police Department
 Little Ferry Police Department
 Little Silver Police Department
 Livingston Police Department
 Lodi Police Department
 Logan Township Police Department
 Long Beach Township Police Department
 Long Branch Police Department
 Longhill Police Department
 Longport Police Department
 Lopatcong Police Department
 Lower Township Police Department
 Lumberton Police Department
 Lyndhurst Police Department
 Madison Police Department
 Magnolia Police Department
 Mahwah Police Department
 Manalapan Police Department
 Manasquan Police Department
 Manchester Township Police Department
 Mansfield Township Police Department (Burlington County)
 Mansfield Township Police Department (Warren County)
 Mantoloking Police Department
 Mantua Township Police Department
 Manville Police Department
 Maple Shade Township Police Department
 Maplewood Police Department
 Margate City Police Department
 Marlboro Police Department
 Matawan Police Department
 Maywood Police Department
 Medford Lakes Police Department
 Medford Township Police Department
 Mendham Borough Police Department
 Mendham Township Police Department
 Merchantville Police Department
 Metuchen Police Department
 Middle Township Police Department
 Middlesex Borough Police Department
 Middletown Township Police Department
 Midland Park Police Department
 Millburn Police Department
 Milltown Police Department
 Millville Police Department
 Monmouth Beach Police Department
 Monroe Township Police Department
 Monroe Township Police Department
 Montclair Police Department
 Montgomery Township Police Department
 Montvale Police Department
 Montville Township Police Department
 Moonachie Police Department
 Moorestown Police Department
 Morris Plains Police Department
 Morris Township Police Department
 Morristown Police Department
 Mount Arlington Police Department
 Mount Ephraim Police Department
 Mount Holly Township Police Department
 Mount Laurel Police Department
 Mount Olive Township Police Department
 Mountain Lakes Police Department
 Mountainside Police Department
 Mullica Township Police Department
 Neptune City Police Department
 Neptune Police Department
 Netcong Police Department
 New Brunswick Police Department
 New Hanover Township Police Department
 New Milford Police Department
 New Providence Police Department
 Newark Police Department
 Newfield Police Department
 Newton Police Department
 North Arlington Police Department
 North Bergen Police Department
 North Brunswick Police Department
 North Caldwell Police Department
 North Haledon Police Department
 North Hanover Township Police Department
 North Plainfield Police Department
 North Wildwood Police Department
 Northfield Police Department
 Northvale Police Department
 Norwood Police Department
 Nutley Police Department 
 Oakland Police Department
 Oaklyn Police Department
 Ocean City Police Department
 Ocean Gate Police Department
 Ocean Township Police Department
 Oceanport Police Department
 Ogdensburg Police Department
 Old Bridge Police Department
 Old Tappan Police Department
 Oradell Police Department
 Orange Township Police Department
 Oxford Township Police Department
 Palisades Park Police Department
 Palmyra Police Department
 Paramus Police Department
 Park Ridge Police Department
 Parsippany-Troy Hills Police Department
 Passaic Police Department
 Paterson Police Department
 Paulsboro Police Department
 Pemberton Borough Police Department
 Pemberton Township Police Department
 Pennington Police Department
 Penns Grove Police Department
 Pennsauken Police Department |  
 Pennsville Police Department
 Pequannock Township Police Department
 Perth Amboy Police Department
 Phillipsburg Police Department
 Picatinny Police Department
 Pine Beach Police Department
 Pine Hill Police Department
 Pine Valley Police Department
 Piscataway Police Department
 Pitman Police Department
 Plainfield Police Department
 Plainsboro Township Police Department
 Pleasantville Police Department
 Plumsted Township Police Department
 Pohatcong Police Department
 Point Pleasant Police Department
 Point Pleasant Beach Police Department
 Pompton Lakes Police Department
 Princeton Police Department
 Prospect Park Police Department
 Rahway Police Department
 Ramsey Police Department
 Randolph Township Police Department
 Raritan Police Department
 Raritan Township Police Department
 Readington Township Police Department
 Red Bank Police Department
 Ridgefield Police Department
 Ridgefield Park Police Department
 Ridgewood Police Department
 Ringwood Police Department
 River Edge Police Department
 River Vale Police Department
 Riverdale Police Department
 Riverside Police Department
 Riverton Police Department
 Robbinsville Police Department
 Rochelle Park Police Department
 Rockaway Police Department
 Roseland Police Department
 Roselle Police Department
 Roselle Park Police Department
 Roxbury Police Department
 Rumson Police Department
 Runnemede Police Department
 Rutherford Police Department
 Saddle Brook Police Department
 Saddle River Police Department
 Salem Police Department
 Sayreville Police Department
 Scotch Plains Police Department
 Sea Bright Police Department
 Sea Girt Police Department
 Sea Isle City Police Department
 Seaside Heights Police Department
 Seaside Park Police Department
 Secaucus Police Department
 Ship Bottom Police Department
 Shrewsbury Police Department
 Somerdale Police Department
 Somers Point Police Department
 Somerville Police Department
 South Amboy Police Department
 South Bound Brook Police Department
 South Brunswick Police Department
 South Hackensack Police Department
 South Harrison Township Police Department
 South Orange Police Department
 South Plainfield Police Department
 South River Police Department
 South Toms River Police Department
 Sparta Police Department
 Spotswood Police Department
 Spring Lake Police Department
 Spring Lake Heights Police Department
 Springfield Township Police Department (Burlington County)
 Springfield Township Police Department (Union County)
 Stafford Township Police Department
 Stanhope Police Department
 Stillwater Township Police Department
 Stone Harbor Police Department
 Summit Police Department
 Surf City Police Department
 Swedesboro Police Department
 Teaneck Police Department
 Tenafly Police Department
 Tewksbury Township Police Department
 Toms River Township Police Department
 Totowa Borough Police Department
 Township of Union Police Department
 Trenton Police Department
 Tuckerton Police Department
 Union Beach Police Department
 Union City Police Department
 Upper Saddle River Police Department
 Ventnor City Police Department
 Vernon Township Police Department
 Verona Police Department
 Vineland Police Department
 Voorhees Police Department
 Waldwick Police Department
 Wall Township Police Department 
 Wallington Police Department
 Wanaque Police Department
 Warren Township Police Department
 Washington Borough Police Department
 Washington Township Police Department
 Washington Township Police Department
 Watchung Police Department
 Waterford Police Department
 Wayne Township Police Department 
 Weehawken Township Police Department
 Wenonah Borough Police Department
 West Amwell Township Police Department
 West Caldwell Police Department
 West Deptford Police Department
 West Long Branch Police Department
 West Milford Police Department
 West New York Police Department
 West Orange Police Department
 West Paterson Police Department
 West Wildwood Police Department
 West Windsor Township Police Department
 Westfield Police Department
 Westville Police Department
 Westwood Police Department
 Wharton Police Department
 Wildwood Police Department
 Wildwood Crest Police Department
 Willingboro Township Police Department
 Winfield Police Department
 Winslow Township Police Department 
 Woodbridge Police Department
 Woodbury Police Department
 Woodbury Heights Police Department
 Woodcliff Lake Police Department
 Woodlynne Police Department
 Wood-Ridge Police Department
 Woodstown Police Department
 Woolwich Township Police Department
 Wyckoff Police Department

College and University, K-12 agencies
Cherry Hiill Campus Police Department https://www.chclc.org/domain/983

 Burlington County College Department of Public Safety
 Brookdale Community College Police Department
 College of New Jersey Police Department
 Drew University Department of Public Safety
 Essex County College Police Department
 Fairleigh Dickinson University Department of Public Safety
 Kean University Department of Public Safety and Police
 Middlesex County College Police Department
 Monmouth University Police Department
 Montclair State University Police Department
 New Jersey Institute of Technology Police Department
 Princeton University Department of Public Safety
 Stockton University Police Department
 Rowan University Department of Public Safety
 Richard Stockton College Police Department
 Rutgers University Police Department
 Stevens Institute of Technology Police Department
 William Paterson University Office of Public Safety

Park police agencies

 Hunterdon County Park Rangers
 New Jersey State Park Police
 Morris County Park Police Department
 Monmouth County Park Rangers

Humane law enforcement agencies

 Atlantic County SPCA Humane Police
 Bergen County SPCA Law Enforcement Division
 Monmouth County SPCA Humane Police
 Passaic County SPCA Humane Police
 Somerset County SPCA Humane Police

Bi-state police agencies
 Burlington County Bridge Commission Police Department
 Delaware River Port Authority Police Department
 Delaware River and Bay Authority Police Department
 Delaware River Joint Toll Bridge Commission
 New York-New Jersey Regional Fugitive Task Force
 Palisades Interstate Parkway Police Department
 Port Authority of New York and New Jersey Police Department
 Waterfront Commission of New York Harbor Police

Railroad police agencies operating within New Jersey

 Amtrak Police Department
 SEPTA Police
 CSX Transportation Police Department
 Conrail Police Department

 Morristown & Erie Railroad Police Department
 New York-New Jersey Cross Harbor Railroad Police Department
 New York, Susquehanna and Western Railway Police Department
 Norfolk Southern Railway Police Department
 New Jersey Transit Police Department

Federal law enforcement agencies operating within New Jersey
 United States Park Police
 United States Department of Justice
 National Park Service Ranger (Law Enforcement)
 United States Fish and Wildlife Service
 United States Coast Guard
 Office of the United States Marshal for the District of New Jersey
 Homeland Security Investigations (HSI)
 United States Secret Service
 Federal Bureau of Investigation
 FBI Police
 Federal Bureau of Prisons
 Federal Reserve Police
 United States Postal Police
 United States Immigration and Customs Enforcement
 United States Customs and Border Protection
 United States Department of Veterans Affairs Police
 Transportation Security Administration
 United States Department of Agriculture - Office of the Inspector General
 Department of Defense Police

Defunct agencies
 Audubon Park Police Department
 Bergen County Police Department
 Burlington County SPCA Humane Police (disbanded 2018)
 Camden Police Department (defunct)
 Port Authority Transit Corporation (PATCO) Police Department (merged into the existing Delaware River Port Authority Police Department)
 Camden County Park Police 
 Essex County Police Department 
 Helmetta Police (disbanded 2018)
 Hudson County Police Department 
 New Jersey State SPCA Humane Police
 Lake Como Police Department (disbanded May 2016)
 Middlesex County Park Police (Replaced by County Park Rangers)
 National Park Police (disbanded 2008)
 Passaic County Park Police 
 Wanaque Reservoir Police Department (disbanded 1999) 
 West Cape May Police (disbanded 2001)

References

New Jersey
 
Law enforcement agencies